Vijaya Ramanayake (1 April 1945 – 26 October 2016) is a Sri Lankan film and music producer, songwriter, journalist and author. He was the founder and producer of Tharanga Music and Film. Ramanayake was the first to introduce compact cassette tapes to Sri Lanka.

Early life 

Vijaya Ramanayake was born 1 April 1945 in Matara, Sri Lanka to Don Deonis Ramanayake (Dondra Head Lighthousekeeper) and Dona Coraneliya Wimala. In his late teens, Ramanayake came to Colombo and worked as an advertising canvasser for the Lakehouse newspaper organisation and then as a journalist.  Ramanayake authored two books, one of which is a children's book.

Career

Music 
In 1978, Ramanayake began Tharanga Records, and quickly dominated the music market.  He produced music for several popular Sri Lankan musicians including W. D. Amaradeva, Clarence Wijewardena, Vijaya Kumarathunge, Milton Perera and Neela Wickramasinghe.  Under the Tharanga label he released Sri Lanka's first audio cassette; Milton Mallawarachchi's Anytime, Anywhere.  In the late 1970s and 1980s many of the country's top hits were produced and in some cases even written by Ramanayake.  The countries key classical music titles are owned and distributed under the Tharanga label.

Film 

In the early 1980s Ramanayake expanded the Tharanga label into production and distribution of popular feature films in Sri Lanka.

His first film in 1981 Aradhana (Invitation) is a tale of love, separation and reconciliation, directed by Wijaya Dharmasri and featuring Malani Fonseka, Ravindra Randeniya, Anoja Weerasinghe and Ramanayake's then 3-year-old son Tharanga. The film was both a critical and a popular success.

Gamperaliya is a 1963 film adapted for screen from the first part of a trilogy of novels by Martin Wickramasinghe.  The film was internationally acclaimed, winning numerous awards and screened at the Cannes Film festival. Ramanayake continued the production  of part two and three in the trilogy, Kaliyugaya (Age of Darkness) 1982, and in Yuganthaya (End Of An Era) 1983.  All three films were directed by Lester James Peries and starred Gamini Fonseka. The trilogy was widely popular.

In 1987 Ramanayake produced Maldeniye Simion, for which he won a Sarasaviya Award for 'Best Picture'.  The film also earned a Silver Peacock Award at the International Film Festival of India.

In the late 1980s, Ramanayake purchased the rights and ownership of Ranmuthu Duwaa, a film made in 1962 by British director Mike Wilson and financed by Arthur C. Clarke. The asset is a landmark of Sri Lankan cinema, it is extremely popular and also the first colour film in the country.  The film was one of Ramanayake's favourites growing up, he took great pride in having it under his banner.

Finance 
In the late 1980s Ramanayake branched into the finance world with several other partners and created Tharanga Investments Ltd.  The company ran a public bus service, imported vehicles for sale and invested in a number of other projects throughout the country and in Singapore.  Unfortunately this venture was short lived and was unsuccessful.

Later life 
In 1988 Ramanayake moved to Canada with his wife Nelum and son, Tharanga.  While there, he produced a Sri Lankan radio program, put on concerts by popular Sri Lankan artists and screened a number of Sri Lankan theatrical releases in Toronto.

Ramanayake returned to Sri Lanka in the late 1990s and successfully relaunched his Tharanga record store.  A number of stores were in various shopping districts within Colombo.  His wife Nelum later joined him in Colombo. His son Tharanga remained in Toronto, Canada.

Ramanayake became terminally ill with cancer at the age of 71.  He passed away 4 months after his diagnosis on 26 October 2016.

References 

1945 births
2016 deaths
Sri Lankan film producers
Sri Lankan record producers
People from Matara, Sri Lanka
Sri Lankan business executives
Canadian people of Sri Lankan descent